The Chief of the Nepalese Army (or Gorkhali Army) is the military position of army head of the Nepalese Army, initially known as Gorkhali Army. The Chief of the Nepalese Army had been from among the Kaji officers during the 18th century. During the reign of Bhimsen Thapa, the title of Commander-in-Chief was introduced for the first time for denoting the army chief. Later in the late 1970s, the title was changed to Chief of Army Staff (CoAS). Currently, the Chief of Army Staff is the Chief of the Nepalese Army.

History

The Chief of Nepalese Army have been mostly drawn from noble Chhetri families from Gorkha such as "Pande dynasty", "Basnyat dynasty", and "Thapa dynasty" before the rule of "Rana dynasty". During the Shah monarchy, the officers were drawn from these aristocratic families. During the Rana dynasty, Ranas overtook the position as birthright. The first army chief of Nepal was King Prithvi Narayan Shah who drafted and commanded the Nepali (Gorkhali) Army. The first civilian army chief was Kaji Kalu Pande who had significant role in the campaign of Nepal. He was considered as army head due to the undertaking of duties and responsibilities of the army but not by the formalization of the title. Both Indra Adhikari and Shiva Ram Khatri mentions Kalu Pande, Vamsharaj Pande, Damodar Pande, Abhiman Singh Basnyat as Chief of Nepalese Army before first titular Commander-in-Chief Bhimsen Thapa.

Mukhtiyar Bhimsen Thapa was the first person to use Commander-in-Chief as the title of army chief. He was given the title of General as an additional portfolio to the position of Mukhtiyar. During the Anglo-Nepalese War, Bhimsen bore all the responsibilities of the army as a Commander-in-Chief. King Rajendra Bikram Shah appointed Bhimsen to the post of Commander-in-Chief on 1835 A.D. and praised Bhimsen for long service to the nation. However, on 14 June 1837, the King took over the command of all the battalions put in charge of various courtiers, and himself became the Commander-in-Chief. Immediately after the incarceration of the Thapas in 1837, Dalbhanjan Pande and Rana Jang Pande were the joint head of military administration. However, Rana Jang was removed after 3 months in October 1837. During the Rana dynasty, the founding Rana Prime Minister Jung Bahadur Rana made the position hereditary on agnatic rolls of succession. The Commander-in-Chief was made the second rank in the hierarchy to Prime Minister of Nepal and was made to succeed as the Prime Minister in case of death of reigning Prime Minister. Commander-in-Chief (C-in-C) was second in the hierarchy than Supreme Commander during Rana Era. The eradication of Rana dynasty from power after Revolution of 1951 did not end Ranas' dominance. During the Panchayat period, the Ranas continued to dominate the rank of Commander-in-Chief of Nepalese Army. In the late 1970s, Commander-in-Chief was replaced by new term Chief of the Army Staff (COAS) from the reign of General Singha Pratap Shah.

List of Chiefs of Nepalese Army

List of Pradhan Senapati (Chief Generals) of Gorkhali Army (1743–1835)

List of Commander-in-Chief of Nepal Army (1835–1979)

List of Chiefs of the Army Staff of Nepal (1979–present)

References

Books

Nepalese military personnel
Military ranks of Nepal